Summerseat, also known as the George Clymer House and Thomas Barclay House, is a historic house museum at Hillcrest and Legion Avenues in Morrisville, Bucks County, Pennsylvania.  Built about 1770, it is the only house known to have been owned by two signers of the United States Declaration of Independence, Founding Fathers George Clymer and Robert Morris, and as a headquarters of General George Washington during the American Revolutionary War.  The house is now managed by the Morrisville Historical Society, which offers tours.  It was designated a National Historic Landmark in 1965.

Description and history
Summerseat is located west of the central business district of Morrisville, sharing a property with what used to be Reiter Elementary School at the junction of Hillcrest and Legion Avenues.  It is a -story masonry structure, built out of a combination of brick and stone.  Its front and sides are brick, while the rear wall is stone.  The main facade faces east, and is five bays wide, with a center entrance framed by pilasters and a fully pedimented gable.  The interior follows a traditional center-hall plan, with four rooms on each floor.  The interior retains some original features, despite having had non-residential uses.

The house was built about 1770 for Thomas Barclay
, and was his house at the end of 1776, when George Washington occupied it as a military headquarters during the dark days of the New York and New Jersey campaign of the American Revolutionary War.  After the war the house was purchased by Robert Morris, a signer of the Declaration of Independence, and the principal financier of the war effort.  Morris fell upon financial hard times owing to failed real estate speculation, and sold the house in 1806 to George Clymer, another signer of the Declaration.  It is Clymer who named the property "Summerseat", and it was his home until his death in 1813.

The house was restored in 1931 and converted for use as a school administrative building in 1935.  Summerseat is now owned and operated as a house museum by the Historic Morrisville Society. The house is open to the public for tours on the first Saturday of each month from 10:00 a.m. to 1:00 p.m. Admission is $7.00 per person, children under the age 12 are free.

See also

List of Washington's Headquarters during the Revolutionary War
List of National Historic Landmarks in Pennsylvania
National Register of Historic Places listings in Bucks County, Pennsylvania

References

External links
Summerseat - Historic Morrisville Society

National Historic Landmarks in Pennsylvania
Houses on the National Register of Historic Places in Pennsylvania
Historic American Buildings Survey in Pennsylvania
Houses completed in 1770
Museums in Bucks County, Pennsylvania
Historic house museums in Pennsylvania
Clymer, George
Houses in Bucks County, Pennsylvania
American Revolutionary War sites
American Revolutionary War museums in Pennsylvania
History of Bucks County, Pennsylvania
National Register of Historic Places in Bucks County, Pennsylvania
1770 establishments in Pennsylvania
Homes of United States Founding Fathers